The Eurofima coach, or European Standard Coach, is a passenger car designed for use on international railway routes in Europe. It was commissioned by the European Company for the Financing of Railroad Rolling Stock.

Overall production was 10 prototypes, followed by 500 coaches ordered in 1973 and delivered in 1977 to the following railway companies:

Austrian Federal Railways (ÖBB): 25 Amoz and 75 Bmoz;
Deutsche Bundesbahn (DB): 100 Avmz 207 first class;
Ferrovie dello Stato (FS): 30 Az and 70 Bz;
French National Railway Corporation (SNCF): 100 A9u;
National Railway Company of Belgium (NMBS-SNCB): 20 A9 and 60 B11;
Swiss Federal Railways (SBB-CFF-FFS): 20 Am 61 85 19–90.

External links 

Railway coaches of Austria
Railway coaches of Belgium
SNCF coaching stock
Railway coaches of Germany
Railway coaches of Italy
Railway coaches of Switzerland
Passenger railroad cars